Kamolwan Chanyim (born 3 January 1996) is a Thai competitive sailor. She was born in Chonburi province eastern of Thailand. She graduated with first-class honors in International Business Management from Burapha University. Her father is an influencer for sailing, she began sailing since she was 8. In the earlier she hated sailing but later when she did better she changed her mindset as she told in marinescene.asia in May 2016 " I started to think that anything is possible if you work hard at it."  

She competed at the 2016 Summer Olympics in Rio de Janeiro, in the women's Laser Radial. She is also the first Thai woman that qualified for the Olympics in sailboat. She finished rank 34 in Laser Radial competition for 2020 Summer Olympics, this is second appearance in Summer Olympics first was in Rio 2016 ranked 32.

References

External links
 
 
 

1996 births
Living people
Kamolwan Chanyim
Kamolwan Chanyim
Sailors at the 2016 Summer Olympics – Laser Radial
Asian Games medalists in sailing
Kamolwan Chanyim
Sailors at the 2014 Asian Games
Sailors at the 2018 Asian Games
Medalists at the 2014 Asian Games
Kamolwan Chanyim
Kamolwan Chanyim
Kamolwan Chanyim
Southeast Asian Games medalists in sailing
Competitors at the 2015 Southeast Asian Games
Competitors at the 2019 Southeast Asian Games
Kamolwan Chanyim
Sailors at the 2020 Summer Olympics – Laser Radial
Kamolwan Chanyim
Kamolwan Chanyim